John Douglass Ferry (May 4, 1912 – October 18, 2002) was a Canadian-born American chemist and biochemist noted for development of surgical products from blood plasma and for studies of the chemistry of large molecules.  Along with Williams and Landel, Ferry co-authored the work on time-temperature superposition in which the now famous WLF equation first appeared.  The National Academy of Sciences called Ferry "a towering figure in polymer science". The University of Wisconsin said that he was "undoubtedly the most widely recognized research pioneer in the study of motional dynamics in macromolecular systems by viscoelastic techniques".

Education
Ferry was born in Dawson City, Yukon Territory, Canada. At age 19, Ferry received his bachelor of arts degree at Stanford University in 1932. Three years later, he received his Ph.D at Stanford and became a research assistant at Stanford's Hopkins Marine Station.

Career
In 1937, Ferry was an instructor of biochemical sciences at Harvard University. He was also a Junior Fellow of the Society of Fellows at Harvard.

He became an assistant professor in the Department of Chemistry of the University of Wisconsin–Madison in 1946 and was made a full professor the following year. Ferry was chairman of the Department of Chemistry at University of Wisconsin–Madison from 1959 to 1967. He was a founding member of the Rheology Research Center at Wisconsin. In 1973 Ferry was a Farrington Daniels Research Professor.

Professional memberships
He was affiliated with the following organizations:
 National Academy of Sciences member
 Chairman of the Committee on Macromolecular Chemistry of the National Research Council
 President of the Society of Rheology

Awards
Ferry received the following notable awards and distinctions:
 Eli Lilly Award in Biological Chemistry of the American Chemical Society
 Bingham Medal of the Society of Rheology
 Colloid Chemistry Award of the American Chemical Society
 High Polymer Physics Prize of the American Physical Society
 Colwyn medal in 1971 of the Institution of the Rubber Industry
 Witco Award in Polymer Chemistry of the American Chemical Society
 Technical Award of the International Institute of Synthetic Rubber Producers
 Charles Goodyear Medal of the Rubber Division of the American Chemical Society

References

1912 births
2002 deaths
People from Dawson City
Stanford University alumni
Canadian chemists
20th-century American chemists
University of Wisconsin–Madison faculty
Members of the United States National Academy of Sciences
Scientists from Madison, Wisconsin
Polymer scientists and engineers
Fellows of the American Physical Society
Canadian emigrants to the United States